The Köchel catalogue is a chronological catalogue of compositions by Wolfgang Amadeus Mozart, originally created by Ludwig Ritter von Köchel, in which the entries are abbreviated K., or KV. The numbers of the Köchel catalogue reflect the continuing establishment of a complete chronology of Mozart's works, and provide a shorthand reference to the compositions.

According to Köchel's counting, Requiem in D minor is the 626th piece Mozart composed, thus is designated K. 626. 

Köchel's original catalogue (1862) has been revised twice; catalogue numbers from the sixth edition are indicated either by parentheses or by superscript: K. 49 (47d) or K. 47d.

History
In the decades after Mozart's death there were several attempts to catalogue his compositions, for example by Franz Gleißner and Johann Anton André (published in 1833), but it was not until 1862 that Ludwig von Köchel succeeded in producing a comprehensive listing. Köchel's 551-page catalogue was titled Chronologisch-thematisches Verzeichnis sämmtlicher Tonwerke W. A. Mozarts (Chronological-thematic Catalogue of the Complete Musical Works of W. A. Mozart). Köchel attempted to arrange the works in chronological order, but many compositions written before 1784 could only be estimated, although Leopold Mozart had compiled a partial list of his son's earlier works; Mozart's catalogue of his own compositions (begun in February 1784 with K. 449) allows relatively precise dating of many of his later works. The catalogue included the opening bars of each piece, known as an incipit. Köchel divided the corpus into a main chronology of 626 works, and five appendices ( in German, abbreviated to Anh.) The appendices (Anh. I–V) included:
I – Lost authentic works
II – Fragments by Mozart
III – Works by Mozart transcribed by others
IV – Doubtful works
V – Misattributed works

Since Köchel published his original catalogue in 1863 (now referred to as K), the dating of Mozart's compositions has been subject to constant revision. Many more pieces have since been found, re-dated, re-attributed and re-numbered, requiring three revised editions of the catalogue.

A major shortcoming of K was that there was no room to expand the strictly sequential numbering in the main catalogue to allow for any new discoveries or further reassessment of existing works. For the 1937 edition (K) Einstein (following the analyses of Théodore de Wyzewa and Georges de St. Foix) reassigned a number of works from the original K appendices into the main catalogue by interpolating new numbers into the main sequence with a lower-case letter suffix. In K some of these were reassessed in the light of scholarship since 1937 and returned to the re-worked appendices:
 K. 626a
 K. 626a I – 64 cadenzas by Mozart to his own keyboard concertos
 K. 626a II – Cadenzas by Mozart to keyboard concertos by other composers
 K. 626b – 42 sketches & other fragments by Mozart (replacing K Anh. II)
 Anh. A – Copies by Mozart of other composers' works
 Anh. B – Works by Mozart transcribed by others
 Anh. C – Doubtful and misattributed vocal (C.1–10) and instrumental (C.11-30) works

For example, the Divertimento for Wind Octet in E was numbered Anh. 226 in K; Einstein placed it in the K main catalogue as K. 196e, between K. 196 and K. 197; K reassigned it again to the 'doubtful' appendix C as Anh. C 17.01. Some works in Anh. A have been identified since 1965 as by Leopold Mozart. Many works in Anh. C have since been more reliably assigned to other composers, or to Mozart himself.

List of existing Mozart compositions
To maintain as much of the original K-numbering of the list as possible, while re-ordering in the revised, chronological sequence, letters were added to the new numbers. The following list shows Köchel's original designation (K) and the sixth edition (K). Other addenda and supplements to the catalogue are marked . (This has been abbreviated to 'Anh.' in the list below.)

Recordings
Recordings of the complete works of Mozart have been issued three times: on the occasion of the bicentenary of Mozart's death in 1991, Philips Classics Records released a 180-CD collection in 45 box sets and each CD in a jewel case, The Complete Mozart Edition, between 1990 and 1991. A selection of 25 CDs from this set, The Best of the Complete Mozart Edition, was published in 1995. The full selection was then released again in 17 box sets as The Compact Complete Mozart Edition in 2000. The Philips collection was made with recordings from world-renowned artists and is of high audio quality. On the occasion of Mozart's 250th birthday in 2006, Brilliant Classics released a single box with 170 CDs, plus one with liner notes to all works and the libretti to vocal works, Mozart Complete Edition. In 2016, for the 225th anniversary of Mozart's death, Decca Classics and Deutsche Grammophon in partnership with the International Mozarteum Foundation released a box of 200 CDs with 2 hardback books with a new Mozart biography by Cliff Eisen and a newly developed short Köchel guide. Mozart 225: The New Complete Edition contains premiere performances of previously lost compositions and never recorded fragments, as well as key works in alternative versions and recordings of legendary historic performances.

See also
 List of compositions
 Church sonatas
 Concert arias, songs and canons
 Masses
 Operas
 Piano concertos
 Solo piano compositions
 Symphonies
 Symphonies of spurious or doubtful authenticity

References

External links
New Mozart Edition on-line
Search Digital Mozart Edition
Opera libretti, critical editions, diplomatic editions, source evaluation (German only), links to online DME recordings; Digital Mozart Edition
Digital Mozart score Viewer (MoVi) for some works, includes synchronised score view/audio, Digital Mozart Edition

Spurious works, MusicBrainz Wiki
Köchel Catalogue, All About Mozart
MozartForum's Köchel Catalogue
Classical Net's Köchel Catalogue
About Franz Gleißner who compiled a catalogue of Mozart's works in Constanze Mozart's estate (in German)

 Koechel catalogue
Classical music catalogues
1862 works